Schwaig is a municipality in the district of Nürnberger Land in Bavaria in Germany.

In 1979 the municipalities Schwaig and Behringersdorf were merged to form the current municipality. Behringersdorf has a railway station on the Nuremberg–Cheb railway.

Notable people
 Hans-Johann Färber (born 1947), Olympic rower
 Oliver Zeidler (born 1996), rower

References

Nürnberger Land